Andreína is a popular female name, of Italian origin, given in the Spanish speaking country of Venezuela, but can also refer to:

Andreína Álvarez (born 1979), Venezuelan actress, entertainer, comedian, and acting teacher
Andreína Castro, winner of the Teen Model Venezuela 2007 pageant
Andreína Gomes, 
Andreína Llamozas, Miss Venezuela International for 1999
Andreína Martínez (born 1997), Dominican–American model and beauty queen who was crowned Miss Dominican Republic 2021
Andreina Pagnani, Italian actress and voice actress
Andreina Pinto, Venezuelan Olympic swimmer
Andreína Prieto, representative of Venezuela to the Miss World 2001 pageant
Andreína Tarazón (born 1988), Venezuelan politician

Spanish feminine given names